Kyle Alexander Dowdy (born February 3, 1993) is an American professional baseball pitcher in the Baltimore Orioles organization. He has previously played in MLB for the Texas Rangers and Cincinnati Reds.

Amateur career
Dowdy graduated from Francis Parker School in San Diego, California, in 2011. Undrafted out of high school in the 2011 MLB draft, he enrolled at the University of Hawaii where he played college baseball for the Hawaii Rainbow Warriors. In 2012, as a freshman, he appeared in 13 games, going 2–3 with a 3.06 earned run average (ERA).

Following his freshman year, Dowdy transferred to Orange Coast College. As a sophomore in 2013, he had a 6–3 record with a 2.38 ERA, striking out 62 batters in 75.2 innings. He transferred to the University of Houston following his sophomore season. He was forced to sit out the 2014 campaign after undergoing Tommy John surgery. In 2015, as a redshirt junior, Dowdy was 9–2 with a 2.45 ERA in 19 games, including 12 starts. After the 2015 season, he was drafted by the Detroit Tigers in the 12th round of the 2015 MLB draft.

Professional career

Detroit Tigers
Dowdy made his professional debut in 2016 with the Class A West Michigan Whitecaps, with whom he was named a Midwest League All-Star. He finished the year 10–3 with a 2.84 ERA in 23 games (16 starts). He spent 2017 with the Class A-Advanced Lakeland Flying Tigers, where he was named to the Florida State League All-Star team, pitching to an 8–12 record with a 3.83 ERA in 25 games (22 starts). He began 2018 with the Double-A Erie SeaWolves and was later promoted to the Triple-A Toledo Mud Hens.

Cleveland Indians
On July 31, 2018, Dowdy and Leonys Martín were traded to the Cleveland Indians in exchange for Willi Castro. He was assigned to the Double-A Akron RubberDucks, where he finished the year. In 30 games (20 starts) between Erie, Toledo, and Akron, he was 9–12 with a 5.15 ERA and a 1.48 WHIP.

The New York Mets selected Dowdy in the 2018 Rule 5 draft on December 13, 2018.

Texas Rangers
The Texas Rangers claimed him from the Mets off of waivers on March 26, 2019, and shortly thereafter, added him to their 25-man roster. He made his major league debut on March 28, 2019, versus the Chicago Cubs, allowing three runs over two innings of relief. 

On July 25, 2019, Dowdy was designated for assignment after going 2–1 with a 7.25 ERA and 17 strikeouts over  innings for Texas.

Cleveland Indians (second stint)
On July 28, 2019, Dowdy was returned to the Cleveland Indians. Dowdy went to Akron following his return and went 1–1 with a 2.48 ERA over 29 innings for them, before finishing the season by appearing in the International League playoffs for the Columbus Clippers. Dowdy did not play in a game for the Indians organization in 2020 due to the cancellation of the minor league season because of the COVID-19 pandemic. In July 2020, Eibner signed on to play for the Eastern Reyes del Tigre of the Constellation Energy League (a makeshift 4-team independent league created as a result of the COVID-19 pandemic) for the 2020 season. Dowdy recorded a 10.13 ERA in 2 games. He returned to the Indians organization in 2021, posting a 4.80 ERA in 39 appearances for Triple-A Columbus. Dowdy elected free agency on November 7, 2021.

Cincinnati Reds
On December 9, 2021, Dowdy signed a minor league contract with the Cincinnati Reds. He had his contract selected on September 13, 2022. On November 15, Dowdy was designated for assignment. On November 18, he was non tendered and became a free agent.

Baltimore Orioles
On December 19, 2022, Dowdy signed a minor league contract with the Baltimore Orioles.

See also
Rule 5 draft results

References

External links

Houston Cougars bio

Living people
1993 births
Sportspeople from Escondido, California
Baseball players from California
Major League Baseball pitchers
Texas Rangers players
Cincinnati Reds players
Hawaii Rainbow Warriors baseball players
Orange Coast Pirates baseball players
Houston Cougars baseball players
Akron RubberDucks players
Erie SeaWolves players
Lakeland Flying Tigers players
Toledo Mud Hens players
West Michigan Whitecaps players
Arizona League Rangers players
Frisco RoughRiders players
Nashville Sounds players
Columbus Clippers players
Louisville Bats players
Eastern Reyes del Tigre players